The Ronald Reagan Freedom Award is the highest honor bestowed by the private Ronald Reagan Presidential Foundation. The award is given to "those who have made monumental and lasting contributions to the cause of freedom worldwide."

Until her death, the award was given by former first lady Nancy Reagan on behalf of her husband, who died in June 2004. The award was first given in 1992, by former president Ronald Reagan himself, as well as in 1993. In 1994, Nancy Reagan presented the award instead of her husband; Ronald Reagan had been diagnosed with Alzheimer's disease a few months before, and was not able to attend the ceremony.

In order to receive the award, the potential recipient must "have made monumental and lasting contributions to the cause of freedom worldwide," as well as "embody President Reagan's lifelong belief that one man or woman truly can make a difference."

Recipients
Former president George H. W. Bush, who was awarded the medal on February 6, 2007, which would have been Ronald Reagan's 96th birthday, remarked, "I wish I had a little Ronald Reagan in me when it came to communicating with the American people. Had I been blessed with my predecessor's remarkable skill, who knows? I might still be employed." On a more serious note, he said later in the speech: "Working with Ronald Reagan was one of the greatest joys of my life."

 1992 – Mikhail Gorbachev, former General Secretary of the Communist Party of the Soviet Union and former President of the Soviet Union.
 1993 – General Colin Powell, former National Security Advisor to President Reagan.
 1994 – Yitzhak Rabin, then Prime Minister of Israel.
 1995 – King Hussein I, then King of Jordan.
 1997 – Bob Hope, entertainer.
 1998 – Margaret Thatcher, former Prime Minister of the United Kingdom.
 2000 – The Reverend Billy Graham, evangelical minister. 
 2002 – Rudy Giuliani, former Mayor of New York City.
 2007 – George H. W. Bush, former President of the United States, served under Reagan as Vice President of the United States.
 2008 – Natan Sharansky, former KGB prisoner, human rights activist and Israeli politician.
 2011 – Lech Wałęsa, former Solidarity leader and former President of Poland.
 2022 – Volodymyr Zelenskyy, President of Ukraine.

See also
 List of awards for contributions to society

References

American awards
Awards established in 1992
Ronald Reagan
Humanitarian and service awards
Monuments and memorials to Ronald Reagan